Livio Philippe Jean-Charles (born November 8, 1993) is a professional basketball player for CSKA Moscow of the VTB United League.

Professional career

ASVEL (2011–2016)
Between 2009 and 2011, Jean-Charles played for Centre Fédéral in the French 3rd-tier level NM1 League. In 2011, Jean-Charles joined ASVEL of the professional French top-tier level LNB Pro A. In April 2013, he participated in the Nike Hoop Summit, where he was named the Most Outstanding Player, after a 27-point, 13-rebound effort, leading the World Team to a 112–98 win over the USA Junior Select Team.

On 27 June 2013 Jean-Charles was selected by the San Antonio Spurs with the 28th overall pick in the 2013 NBA draft.

Jean-Charles spent five seasons with ASVEL. In the 2015–16 season, he saw action in 25 games, averaging 5.9 points and 4.6 rebounds per game, in 21.2 minutes per game, while shooting .552 (64-116) from the field and .655 (19-29) from the foul line. In the playoffs, he appeared in 11 games, upping his averages to 7.5 points and 4.8 rebounds in 25.9 minutes per game, helping lead ASVEL to the French Pro A championship. He also made eight FIBA Europe Cup appearances, averaging 8.8 points, 6.3 rebounds, and 1.6 assists, in 23.9 minutes per game.

Austin Spurs (2016–2017)
In July 2016, Jean-Charles joined the Spurs for the 2016 NBA Summer League and on 22 July 2016 he signed with the San Antonio Spurs, but was waived on October 22 after appearing in five preseason games. Seven days later, he was acquired by the Austin Spurs of the NBA Development League as an affiliate of San Antonio.

Return to ASVEL (2017) 
On 30 March 2017, Jean-Charles' return to ASVEL was announced. He signed for the remainder of the 2016–17 season.

Return to Austin (2017–2018) 
On 2 November 2017 Jean-Charles was included in the 2017–18 opening night roster for Austin Spurs.

Unicaja (2018)
On 18 March 2018 Unicaja of the Liga ACB announced that they had signed Jean-Charles.

Third stint with ASVEL (2018–2020)
On 5 July 2018 ASVEL Basket of the LNB Pro A announced that they had signed Jean-Charles to a three-year contract.

Olympiacos (2020–2022)
On July 1, 2020, Olympiacos announced that they had signed a two-year contract with Jean-Charles.

CSKA (2022–present)
On July 2022, he left Olympiacos and signed a contract with PBC CSKA Moscow for one season with option for additional season. During the season he lead them to a record of 24 victories in row at the regular season of the VTB United League.

National team career
Jean-Charles has represented the French under-20 national team at the 2012 FIBA Europe Under-20 Championship, and the 2013 FIBA Europe Under-20 Championship. At the 2013 FIBA Europe Under-20 Championship, he averaged 17.2 points, 6.3 rebounds, and 1.5 assists per game.

EuroLeague Career statistics

|-
| align=center | 2010-11
| align=left | CFBB 
| FFBL
| 29 || 30.0 || .532 || .250 || .708 || 5.3 || 1.3 || .8 || .4 || 13.0
|-
| align=center | 2011-12
| align=left | ASVEL
| LNB Pro A
| 44 || 5.4 || .400 || .273 || .714 || 1.0 || .2 || .1 || .1 || 1.0
|-
| align=center | 2012-13
| align=left | ASVEL
| EuroCup
| 10 || 8.4 || .438 || .333 || .750 || 1.5 || .5 || .0 || .3 || 2.4
|-

References

External links
 Livio Jean-Charles at eurobasket.com
 Livio Jean-Charles at euroleague.net
 Livio Jean-Charles at fiba.com (archive)
 Livio Jean-Charles at fibaeurope.com
 Livio Jean-Charles at lnb.fr 

1993 births
Living people
ASVEL Basket players
Austin Spurs players
Baloncesto Málaga players
Black French sportspeople
Centers (basketball)
French expatriate basketball people in Spain
French expatriate basketball people in the United States
French expatriate basketball people in Greece
French Guianan basketball players
French men's basketball players
French people of French Guianan descent
Liga ACB players
Olympiacos B.C. players
Sportspeople from Cayenne
Power forwards (basketball)
San Antonio Spurs draft picks
Small forwards